Commercial Bulletin may refer to:

Daily Commercial Bulletin (New York), which merged into The Journal of Commerce
Commercial Bulletin (Boston), Boston
Commercial Bulletin (1872), Troy, Illinois
The Commercial Bulletin (1885–1888), Lane, Kansas
Commercial Bulletin (1880–?), Jackson, Tennessee
New-Orleans Commercial Bulletin, New Orleans; merged into New Orleans Price Current
Twin City Commercial Bulletin, Minneapolis
Daily Commercial Bulletin, Chicago, Illinois
Daily Commercial Bulletin (St. Louis), St. Louis
Daily Commercial Bulletin (Honolulu) (1871–1881), Honolulu
The American Manufacturer, formerly known as Daily Commercial Bulletin and American Manufacturer

See also 

 Bulletin (disambiguation)